Miles Murphy (born 19 May 1967) is an Australian former sprinter who competed in the 1988 Summer Olympics. At the 1986 Commonwealth Games he won a silver medal in the 4 x 400 metres relay.

He was Chief Executive Officer, Australian Paralympic Committee in 2009.

References

1967 births
Living people
Australian male sprinters
Olympic athletes of Australia
Athletes (track and field) at the 1988 Summer Olympics
Commonwealth Games silver medallists for Australia
Athletes (track and field) at the 1986 Commonwealth Games
Commonwealth Games medallists in athletics
World Athletics U20 Championships winners
Medallists at the 1986 Commonwealth Games